The Nanning Mosque is a mosque in Xingning District, Nanning City, Guangxi, China.

History
The mosque was originally built from 1644 to 1661 during the reign of the Qing Dynasty Shunzhi Emperor. In 1717, the mosque was relocated to its current location. The mosque was closed and destroyed during the Cultural Revolution in 1966-1976 and was rebuilt in 1981.

Architecture
The mosque is a three-story building which covers an area of 1,890 m2 which can accommodate around 200 people. It has Arabic style with conical roof and arch-style doors and windows. The first floor is used for restaurant area. The second floor is used for meeting room, office room and dormitory room. The third floor is the prayer hall.

See also
 Islam in China
 List of mosques in China

References

1707 establishments in China
Buildings and structures in Nanning
Mosques in China
Religious buildings and structures completed in 1707
Religion in Guangxi